Norbert Witkowski (born August 5, 1981) is a Polish former footballer who played as a goalkeeper.

Club career

Early career
He previously played for Stomil Olsztyn, Polonia Lidzbark Warmiński, Stasiak Opoczno and Drwęca Nowe Miasto Lubawskie.

Arka Gdynia
He made his Ekstraklasa debut on 15 October 2005 versus Amica Wronki.

Iraklis
On 24 January 2011 he signed a 1.5-years contract with Greek Superleague outfit Iraklis.

References

External links

Norbert Witkowski at Iraklis FC Official site.

1981 births
Living people
OKS Stomil Olsztyn players
Arka Gdynia players
Iraklis Thessaloniki F.C. players
Górnik Zabrze players
Polish footballers
Sportspeople from Olsztyn
Association football goalkeepers